Themesion is a genus of skippers in the family Hesperiidae.

References
Natural History Museum Lepidoptera genus database

Hesperiidae
Hesperiidae genera